Akil Gjakova (born 4 January 1996) is a Kosovan judoka. He is a gold medalist at the Mediterranean Games and the European Judo Championships.

Career
He won the gold medal in the men's 73 kg event at the 2018 Mediterranean Games held in Tarragona, Spain.

In 2021, he won the gold medal in the men's 73 kg event at the European Judo Championships held in Lisbon, Portugal.

He represented Kosovo at the 2015 European Games in Baku, Azerbaijan and the 2019 European Games in Minsk, Belarus.

Personal life
His sister Nora Gjakova is also a judoka.

Achievements

References

External links
 

Living people
1996 births
Sportspeople from Peja
Kosovan male judoka
Mediterranean Games gold medalists for Kosovo
Mediterranean Games bronze medalists for Kosovo
Mediterranean Games medalists in judo
Competitors at the 2018 Mediterranean Games
Competitors at the 2022 Mediterranean Games
European Games competitors for Kosovo
Judoka at the 2015 European Games
Judoka at the 2019 European Games
Judoka at the 2020 Summer Olympics
Olympic judoka of Kosovo